The AEG turbine factory was built in 1909, at Huttenstraße 12–16 in the Moabit district of Berlin. It is the best-known work of architect Peter Behrens.  The 100m long steel  framed building with 15m tall glass windows on either side is considered the first attempt to introduce restrained modern design to industrial architecture. It was a bold move, and world first that would have a durable impact on architecture as a whole.

Origin
Since 1892, the site was occupied by the Union-Elektricitäts-Gesellschaft (UEG), which was an electrical company founded by August Thyssen and the Thomson Houston Electric Company. The company's goal was to enter the booming electrical industry, and this site was dedicated to the production of electric trams. The UEG quickly encountered financial difficulties, and the Allgemeine Elektricitäts-Gesellschaft (AEG) took over in 1904 and planned the construction of a new turbine factory, as the existing factory had become too small.

Architect Peter Behrens was commissioned with the design of the new building. More than an architect, Behrens was employed by AEG since 1907 as an artistic consultant, and designed the company's electrical products, as well as its logo and other company graphics. He was also in charge of the overall image of the company. Initially influenced by the  Art Nouveau in 1901-3, Behrens soon became a founding member of the German Werkbund; influenced by the British Arts and Crafts, they were dedicated to raising the quality of German design, developing architecture that was rational for the modern age, while still embracing classical traditions.

Construction 

The turbine hall was built in 1909 under Peter Behrens as lead architect and engineer Karl Bernhard at the corner of Huttenstraße and Berlichingenstraße streets in Berlin-Moabit. It consists of two parallel spaces, a lower space attached to the west of the main one. The main space is 25.6m wide (the lower one 12.5m), with a height of 25 m and a length of 123 m  , with a body formed by 22 steel frames, placed every 9 meters. The steel columns appear on the outside unadorned, with bolts and joints visible, with huge glass windows between, angled slightly inwards towards the top. The gable ends are constructed of reinforced concrete, with metal strapping on the piers either side creating a rusticated appearance, and the firm's logo is cast in the concrete of the gable.

In 1939, Jacob Schallberger and Paul Schmidt designed an extension of the hall to the north extending it to 207m. The whole building was developed to function as a production site for turbines. It is now part of Siemens, which still operates a gas turbine plant there. This factory was actually designed with such foresight that it still serves the same purpose of producing turbines, a hundred years later.

Significance 
Behrens design referenced the neo-classical, with metal strapping on the piers of the gable end either side creating a rusticated appearance. David Watkin describes it as a "temple of power". Similarly, Tom Wilkinson likens it to an "up-to-date edition of the Parthenon".

Factory design at that time was either unpretentious steel and glass, or a "crenellated castle-cities" with a dowdy coat of historicist design, hiding the technology within. Peter Behrens created an architecture for industry that came out of hiding behind historicist facades for the first time, transformed by a new self-confidence, creating a suitably impressive and sophisticated image for the public face of the Moabit industrial site.

Franz Hessel wrote, "There is no lovelier building than that monumental hall of glass and reinforced concrete: the Peter Behrens turbine factory on Huttenstrasse."

Since 1956 the building has been classified as a protected historical monument, and it underwent a restoration in 1978. On the south side there is a plaque with information about the construction, architects, and heritage status.

Further reading 
Landesdenkmalamt Berlin (Hrsg.), Jürgen Tomisch (Bearb.): Deutsche Denkmaltopographie, Denkmale in Berlin, Bezirk Mitte, Ortsteile Moabit, Hansaviertel und Tiergarten. Michael Imhof Verlag, Petersberg 2005, pages 292–298.
William J. R. Curtis: Moderne Architektur seit 1900, englische Erstausgabe von 1982, 2002
Peter Behrens: Umbautes Licht, Munich, 1990
F. Neumeyer, T. Buddensieg, H. Rogge, among others, Industriekultur – Peter Behrens und die AEG 1907–1914, 1993
Herbert Kurth, Aribert Kutschmar: Baustilfibel, Berlin, 1964
Epochen der Kunst. Unterrichtswerk in vier Banden, Band 4, München, 1989, page 176
Jan Gympel: Geschichte der Architektur, Cologne, 1996
Jürgen Tomisch: Bezirk Mitte. Ortsteile Moabit, Hansaviertel und Tiergarten, Petersberg, 2005
Louis Sullivan: The tall office building artistically considered, Lippincott's Magazine, Marz 1896

References

External links
Berliner Industriedenkmäler – AEG Turbinenhalle

AEG Turbine Hall, State Monument Office Berlin listing.

Manufacturing plants in Germany
Industrial buildings completed in 1909
Buildings and structures in Mitte
Art Nouveau architecture in Berlin
Art Nouveau industrial buildings
Peter Behrens